Bevis Alan McLean "Bev" Wilson (14 May 1924 – 27 August 1987) was an English professional footballer who played as a centre-back. He made over 400 appearances in the English Football League with Wrexham and Barrow.

Career
He signed for Wrexham in June 1947 after playing in the army team during World War 2. He spent nearly 4 years at the Welsh club before signing for Barrow in 1951, where he played over 300 games in 8 years.

In 1959 he moved to non-league Yeovil Town.

References

1924 births
1987 deaths
Wrexham A.F.C. players
Barrow A.F.C. players
Yeovil Town F.C. players
English footballers
Association football defenders